Pain and Glory is a 2019 Spanish drama film written and directed by Pedro Almodóvar. It stars Antonio Banderas, Asier Etxeandia, Leonardo Sbaraglia, Nora Navas, Julieta Serrano, and Penélope Cruz.

The film was released in Spain on 22 March 2019 to positive reviews. It made its international debut at the 2019 Cannes Film Festival, where it competed for the Palme d'Or and won two awards: Banderas for Best Actor and Alberto Iglesias for Best Soundtrack. At the 92nd Academy Awards, Pain and Glory was nominated for Best International Feature Film, and Banderas was nominated for Best Actor. Time magazine chose the film as the best movie of 2019.

Plot
Spanish film director Salvador Mallo is in decline, both physically and mentally, which has made him reflective. His chronic back pain and headaches, in particular, have kept him from even considering trying to start a new project for several years, and recently he started to experience a persistent and troubling dysphagia.

Flavor, one of Salvador's old films, has just been restored, and he was asked to appear at a screening. He has not seen Alberto Crespo, the lead actor of the film, in 32 years, but he decides to reach out and ask if Alberto will help present Flavor. Their falling-out was centered around Alberto's heroin use during filming, so Alberto, who still smokes heroin, is surprised when Salvador asks for some when he is getting ready to smoke. Under the influence, Salvador remembers moving with his parents into a whitewashed cave-house in Paterna in the 1960s.

When Alberto arrives to take Salvador to the screening, Salvador decides not to go, but the moderator of the planned Q&A gets them to answer audience questions over the phone. Several people ask about the argument between Salvador and Alberto, and Salvador ends up repeating his old criticisms. Although he says he now approves of Alberto's performance, Alberto is enraged and leaves.

Salvador starts to regularly take heroin to manage his pain. He remembers when, as a small boy, his mother arranged for him to teach a young man named Eduardo how to read, write, and do math in exchange for work on the cave, and then used this as evidence of his intelligence to gain him admittance to a seminary. He did not want to leave home or become a priest, but, because they were poor, his mother saw it as the only way for him to get an education.

To make amends, Salvador agrees to let Alberto stage, as a monologue, a story he wrote about a relationship he had in the early 1980s that fell apart due to his partner's heroin use. Coincidentally, Federico, who the story is about, goes to see the show, and Alberto gives Salvador's contact information to him. When the former lovers meet, Federico says he has been living in Argentina and this is the first time he has come back to Madrid in decades. He reveals that he has a wife, from whom he is separated, and two sons, and he has not dated a man since he broke up with Salvador. On his way out the door, Federico offers to stay the night, but Salvador says they should leave their romantic relationship in the past, and Federico insists Salvador come to Buenos Aires to meet his family.

Once he is alone, Salvador goes to take some heroin, but instead throws it all away. He sees doctors about his pain and dysphagia and admits to his heroin use and that he still has not recovered from either the death of his mother  four years earlier or a back surgery two years after that. Salvador remembers when his mother lived with him near the end of her life and relates to his assistant, Mercedes, how she had told him she did not want him to write stories about her and thought he had always blamed her for sending him to the seminary. Although, before his mother died, Salvador was able to apologize for not being the son she wanted, he feels guilty he was not able to take her to her village to die, like he had promised.

Mercedes shows Salvador an invitation to a small art gallery that has a portrait of a small boy on it. He seems to recognize the painting, and, during a CT scan of his neck, remembers when Eduardo started it one day after working at the Mallos' cave-house. Eduardo cleaned himself up before leaving, and Salvador swooned when he went to bring the man a towel and saw Eduardo naked, marking his sexual awakening.

After being told his dysphagia is being caused by a calcified growth in his neck, which can be removed, Salvador goes to the art gallery and learns that the owner had found Eduardo's portrait of him at a flea market. Salvador buys the painting and discovers a letter written on the back in which Eduardo thanks him for his help with writing and math and gives him an updated address so they can stay in touch.

On the way to have his operation, Salvador muses to Mercedes that his mother must have received the portrait, but never mentioned it to him at school. Mercedes asks if he will try to find Eduardo, but he says too much time has passed and what matters is that the painting finally made its way to him. Before Salvador loses consciousness from the anesthetic, he mentions to his doctor that he has started writing again. He is then seen on a film set directing a scene from his childhood.

Cast

Production
El Deseo announced plans for the new film in April 2018, confirming Antonio Banderas and Asier Etxeandia as leads with Penélope Cruz and Julieta Serrano in supporting roles. Rosalía's appearance in the film was revealed by her presence in the trailer, which premiered on 31 January 2019.

In May 2018, Almodóvar was pictured researching locations in the Province of Valencia with cinematographer José Luis Alcaine. The following June, Fotogramas reported that a large part of the filming would take place in Valencia, particularly in the municipality of Paterna. The same month, Agustín Almodóvar, the producer of the film, posted a photo on Twitter of his brother, Pedro, on set, which was later followed by photos of Banderas, Sbaraglia, and Cruz together in screen tests for the film.

Agustín Almodóvar announced via Twitter that filming began on 16 July 2018. The 44-day shoot concluded on 15 September.

Release
Pain and Glory was released in Spain on 22 March 2019. It was released in the United Kingdom by Pathé and 20th Century Fox on 23 August, and received a limited release in the United States from Sony Pictures Classics starting on 4 October.

Reception

Box office
The film drew more than 45,000 moviegoers in Spain on the Friday of its release, making it the most-viewed film in the country on that day. It was estimated the film earned €300,000 in its first day and €1.2 million in its debut weekend. By 12 September 2019, the film had grossed a total of €6.5 million in Spain, making it the highest-grossing Spanish film of the year at the box office. Worldwide, Pain and Glory has earned $36.6 million.

Critical response
On Metacritic, the film has a weighted average score of 88 out of 100, based on 42 critics, indicating "universal acclaim".

Initial Spanish critical reception of the film was generally positive. Pain and Glory received an average score of 7.7/10 from 1,448 reviews on FilmAffinity, and an average critical rating of 4.3/5 from 14 critical reviews on Sensacine. Fotogramas gave the film a 5-star review that complimented the director's artistry.
El Periódico de Catalunya also gave the film five stars, while ABC gave the film 4 out of 5 stars, and El Confidencial gave the film 3 out of 5 stars. Catalan daily newspaper Ara compared the film's twilight serenity and checked emotion to that of the masterpiece last films made by John Huston (The Dead) and Carl Theodor Dreyer (Gertrud).

Manohla Dargis of the New York Times gave the film a rave review and chose it as her Critic's pick of the week writing: "A great deal happens in “Pain and Glory,” just not ritualistically and not at top volume. Its agonies are tempered, its regrets hushed, its restraint powerful." She also named it "The Best Movie of 2019".

Time magazine named Pain and Glory as the best film of 2019. The Guardian ranked the film at No. 10 on its list of the "50 best films of 2019". Sight & Sound magazine named it the 6th-best film of the year.

The movie has been said to be an homage to the works of Paul Auster. At one point, while Salvador is in a heroin-induced stupor, Alberto logs on to his computer. As the camera pans across the desktop screen, an icon entitled "Paul Auster" can be seen. The narrative structure and arc of the film, with its many coincidences (Federico stumbling upon the performance of the play; the discovery of Eduardo's portrait of Salvador many years after it was painted) are like a visual depiction of an Auster novel.

In an academic research, Shlomit Lir and Liat Ayalon wrote about the movie in relation to the myth of the absolute creator and of the danger of the process of regression into the world of creative arts, which is actualized in by the protagonist's inability to overcome the residues of the past. According to the authors, the absolute director is so deeply involved in his work that he find it difficult to speak any language other than cinema.

Accolades

See also 
 List of Spanish films of 2019
 List of submissions to the 92nd Academy Awards for Best International Feature Film
 List of Spanish submissions for the Academy Award for Best International Feature Film

Notes

References

External links
 

Films directed by Pedro Almodóvar
Films produced by Agustín Almodóvar
Gay-related films
Films about actors
Films about depression
Films about film directors and producers
Films about filmmaking
Films about heroin addiction
Films about screenwriters
Spanish LGBT-related films
Films shot in the Valencian Community
Films shot in Madrid
Films set in Madrid
Films set in the 1960s
Self-reflexive films
Sony Pictures Classics films
2019 LGBT-related films
2019 films
LGBT-related drama films
Spanish drama films
Best Film Goya Award winners
2019 drama films
El Deseo films
2010s Spanish-language films
2010s Spanish films